O.C. Tanner Company is an employee recognition company based in Salt Lake City, Utah. The company maintains offices in Canada, England, Singapore, Australia, and India, and is one of the largest manufacturers of retail and corporate awards in the United States. The company made the medals for the 2002, U.S.-hosted Winter Olympics.

History

O.C. Tanner was founded by Obert C. Tanner in 1927. The company started off by selling class rings and pins to high school and college graduates.

In 1981, the company benefited directly from a addition in the Economic Recovery Tax Act of 1981, which increased the tax deduction on employee recognition awards. These benefits were still in place as of 2018.

In preparation for the 2002 Winter Olympics, O.C. Tanner was commissioned by the United States Olympic Committee to create the medals for the winning athletes in each event.

 
In 2003, O.C. Tanner acquired the Hansen Planetarium building. Listed on the National Register of Historic Places in 1979, the building was previously used as the Salt Lake city library until the 1960s, when it was renovated to become Hansen Planetarium. Following the purchase, O.C. Tanner renovated the building to serve as a new company main jewelry store. The new store opened in 2009.

In 2014, O.C. Tanner announced Tanner Labs, a new research and development arm of the company. The company intended to increase software innovation in the company workforce.  O.C. Tanner switched focus from a manufacturing company to a software company providing clients with recognition software for their employees.  O.C. Tanner was an early innovator in the recognition software space, and is seen as a major player. Their tag line is "Help people Thrive at work".

In May 2019, O.C. Tanner designed a copper spike replica of the original Golden spike ceremonially driven at the joining of the First transcontinental railroad. This was in conjunction with the 150th anniversary celebration of the joining held at Golden Spike National Historical Park. Following the ceremonies, the spike was placed on display in the Utah State Capitol.

Obert Tanner remained actively involved with the company until his death in 1993. His daughter, Carolyn Tanner Irish, remained as chairperson of the board of the company until her death in 2021.

Philanthropy

Since the 2000 Summer Olympics in Sydney, Australia, O.C. Tanner has donated gold rings to athletes and support staff for the US Olympic and Paralympic teams.

O.C. Tanner annually sponsors the O.C. Tanner Gift of Music, a series of free concerts held in conjunction with the Utah Symphony and the Tabernacle Choir at Temple Square. These concerts were initiated by Obert Tanner and Gordon B. Hinckley, future president of the Church of Jesus Christ of Latter-day Saints, in the 1970s as a way to give back to the community. These concerts are held on Temple Square in Salt Lake City and feature the Utah Symphony, the Tabernacle Choir at Temple Square, and various vocal artists over the years.

References

External links

1927 establishments in Utah
Manufacturing companies of the United States